Vondrozo is a district of Atsimo-Atsinanana in Madagascar.

Communes
The district is further divided into 16 communes:

 Ambohimana
 Anandravy
 Andakana
 Antokonala
 Iamonta
 Ivato
 Karianga
 Mahatsinjo
 Mahavelo
 Mahazoarivo
 Manambidala
 Manato
 Maroteza
 Vohiboreka
 Vohimary
 Vondrozo

References 

Districts of Atsimo-Atsinanana